Magic is a 1981 album by Tom Browne and was released on the Arista Records label. The song, "Thighs High (Grip Your Hips and Move)" features vocals by Toni Smith and peaked at #4 on the R&B charts. Another song, "Let's Dance", peaked at #69 on the R&B charts. "God Bless the Child" is a cover of the song by Billie Holiday.

Track listing
All tracks composed by Tom Browne, except where indicated
 "Let's Dance" (Sekou Bunch) – 5:24
 "Magic" (Clifford Branch Jr.) – 4:27
 "I Know" – 4:48
 "Midnight Interlude" (Grisha Dimont, Dennis Bell, Claudette Washington) – 5:23
 "God Bless the Child" (Billie Holiday) – 5:07
 "Night Wind" (Dave Grusin) – 6:32
 "Thighs High (Grip Your Hips and Move)" (Browne, Bunch, Grusin, Toni Smith) – 4:40
 "Making Plans" (Ronny Pace) – 4:04

Charts

References
Magic at [ Allmusic]

1981 albums
Tom Browne (trumpeter) albums
Arista Records albums